Plagiognathus is a genus of plant bugs in the family Miridae. There are at least 110 described species in Plagiognathus.

See also
 List of Plagiognathus species

References

 Henry, Thomas J., and Richard C. Froeschner, eds. (1988). Catalog of the Heteroptera, or True Bugs, of Canada and the Continental United States, xix + 958.
 Schuh, Randall T. (2001). "Revision of New World Plagiognathus Fieber, with comments on the Palearctic fauna and the description of a new genus (Heteroptera: Miridae: Phylinae)". Bulletin of the American Museum of Natural History, no. 266, 267.
 Thomas J. Henry, Richard C. Froeschner. (1988). Catalog of the Heteroptera, True Bugs of Canada and the Continental United States. Brill Academic Publishers.

Further reading

 NCBI Taxonomy Browser, Plagiognathus